Nas & Ill Will Records Presents QB's Finest, commonly known as simply QB's Finest, is a compilation album released on November 21, 2000 and the second release from rapper Nas' new Ill Will Records imprint, distributed by Columbia Records. It featured Nas and a number of other rappers from the Queensbridge housing projects, including Mobb Deep, Nature, Nashawn, Littles, Bravehearts and Cormega, who had briefly reconciled a longtime feud with Nas.

The album also featured guest appearances from Queensbridge's hip hop legends Roxanne Shanté, MC Shan and Marley Marl, both of whom appeared on the lead single "Da Bridge 2001" (based on MC Shan's and Marley Marl's 1986 classic "The Bridge"). "Da Bridge 2001" also featured a response from Nas to Memphis Bleek, in which Nas calls out most of the Roc-A-Fella Records roster, including Memphis Bleek, Damon Dash, Beanie Sigel and Jay-Z. The album's biggest hit single was "Oochie Wally", a club anthem recorded by the Bravehearts. The album was certified Gold by the Recording Industry Association of America (RIAA) on March 12, 2001.

Track listing

Though numbered correctly in the liner notes, the original compact disc pressing erroneously combined tracks one and two during mastering, throwing off the count for the rest of the tracks by one number (i.e., "We Live This" is track two, "Real Niggas" is track three, and so on). Later, corrected masters feature the "Oochie Wally" remix (which features Nas in addition to the Bravehearts) in place of the original.

Samples
"Da Bridge 2001" contains a sample from "The Bridge" by MC Shan
"Find Ya Wealth" contains a sample from "Solstice" by Brian Bennett
"Straight Outta Q.B." contains a sample from "Straight Outta Compton" by N.W.A. Cormega's verse contains many recycled lyrics from Ice Cube's verse on the original song.
"Oochie Wally" contains a sample from "Bambooji" by Gong
"Street Glory" contains a sample from "Once Upon a Time" by Donna Summer
"Money" contains a sample from the theme song of Phantasm by Fred Myrow
"Self Conscience" contains a sample from The Exorcist theme "Tubular Bells" by Mike Oldfield
"Die 4" contains a sample from the theme song of Halloween by John Carpenter
"Kids in da PJ's contains a sample from "The Gathering" by Chris Spheeris

Charts

Weekly charts

Year-end charts

Singles chart positions

Certifications

References

External links
QB's Finest Online (archived version from June 2, 2009)

2000 compilation albums
Albums produced by the Alchemist (musician)
Albums produced by Havoc (musician)
Albums produced by Scott Storch
Bravehearts albums
Columbia Records compilation albums
Mobb Deep albums
Nas compilation albums
Record label compilation albums